Electrophaes aggrediens is a moth of the family Geometridae first described by Louis Beethoven Prout in 1940. It can be found in China.

External links
"Electrophaes aggrediens". ZipcodeZoo.com. Archived from the original March 14, 2012.

Cidariini